The KTM 690 Duke is the latest generation in KTM's line of midrange single-cylinder engine supermoto, or naked motorcycles that began with the 1994  displacement Duke 620 or Duke I, followed by the 1998  Duke 640 or Duke II, followed by the  Duke III, and finally the  Duke IV made since 2012. Both the Duke III and Duke IV are called the 690 Duke

The Duke was KTM's first street bike, and first supermoto, having previously made only off-road and racing motorcycles. In 1998 KTM introduced the 640 Supermoto, so the Duke line became a more street oriented standard or streetfighter, while retaining some off-road characteristics like a relatively long suspension travel. Initially the Duke was KTM's entry level street bike, but later KTM partnered with Bajaj Auto to produce the 125 Duke, 200 Duke, and 390 Duke in India, placing the 600 cc class Dukes in the middle of their range.

Specifications

Notes

References

External links

Duke 690
Standard motorcycles
Motorcycles introduced in 1994